Chelipodozus is a genus of flies in the family Empididae.

Species
C. araucariana Plant, 2008
C. australis Plant, 2008
C. chelipodiformis Plant, 2008
C. chodlipang Plant, 2008
C. cinereus Collin, 1933
C. luteothorax Plant, 2008
C. mapucheensis Plant, 2008
C. ochraceus Collin, 1933
C. trauco Plant, 2008

References

Empidoidea genera
Empididae